Alioune Badara Cissé (7 February 1958 – 28 August 2021) was a Senegalese politician. A member of the Alliance for the Republic (APR), he served as Foreign Minister of Senegal from 4 April to 29 October 2012.

Biography
Born in Saint-Louis on 7 February 1958, Cissé passed his primary studies in his native city. He studied foreign language application in English and Spanish at Cheikh Anta Diop University and graduated in 1980. He then studied at Jean Monnet University and the Institut d'études politiques de Toulouse.

In 1988, Cissé returned to Senegal and was admitted to the Dakar Bar, becoming a lawyer in 1992. That year, he was awarded the Hubert H. Humphrey Fellowship Program to study at the University of Minnesota. He earned a doctorate in law from Hamline University School of Law in Saint Paul, Minnesota.

In 2007, Cissé became a special advisor to Prime Minister Macky Sall. When Sall became President, he appointed Cissé to be Foreign Minister. He held the position for seven months before returning to his activities as a lawyer. In August 2015, he was appointed Mediator of the Republic, replacing Serigne Diop.

Alioune Badara Cissé died from complications of COVID-19 in Dakar on 28 August 2021 at the age of 63.

References

1958 births
2021 deaths
Senegalese jurists
Senegalese politicians
Foreign ministers of Senegal
Alliance for the Republic (Senegal) politicians
Cheikh Anta Diop University alumni
Jean Monnet University alumni
Instituts d'études politiques alumni
Hamline University School of Law alumni
People from Saint-Louis, Senegal
Deaths from the COVID-19 pandemic in Senegal